is a Japanese composer and arranger, known for his work on television dramas and anime series.

Biography
Yokoyama was born in Nagano Prefecture. He started to take piano lessons at the age of three, taught by his aunt who is an alumna of Kunitachi College of Music, but became interested in music when he was in elementary school, after playing his own compositions. When he was in middle school, he began to compose music using a synthesizer that he bought and his computer, and had also briefly played in a band. Interested in computers, Yokoyama attended National Institute of Technology, Nagano College, studying electronic engineering for five years after graduating from middie school.

Influenced by Joe Hisaishis music in Studio Ghiblis films that he watched when he was young and musician Tetsuya Komuro, Yokoyama decided to pursue a career in music and attended Kunitachi College of Music when he was nineteen, following his aunt encouragement. While in college, he met guitarist Hiroaki Tsutsumi, who would later work with Yokoyama on many projects. After graduating, Yokoyama worked as a freelancer, writing songs for various artists, before joining the music production company Miracle Bus in 2009, where he began to produce soundtracks for television dramas, anime, and other media. His first work as a sole composer was the 2011 television drama series Mitsu no Aji: A Taste of Honey.

He occasionally records his score overseas, and improvises instruments that would match the concept of each work, such as using buckets and decking brushes as instruments when recording the soundtrack for Mobile Suit Gundam: Iron-Blooded Orphans.

Works

Anime

Anime films

Television dramas

Live-action films

Other projects

References

External links
 Profile at Miracle Bus 
 

1982 births
21st-century Japanese composers
21st-century Japanese male musicians
Anime composers
Japanese film score composers
Japanese male film score composers
Japanese music arrangers
Japanese television composers
Kunitachi College of Music alumni
Living people
Male television composers
Musicians from Nagano Prefecture